New Mangalore Port is a small water af, all-weather port at Panambur, Mangalore in Karnataka state in India, which is the deepest inner harbour on the west coast. It is the only major port of Karnataka and the seventh largest port in India. It is operated by New Mangalore Port Authority (NMPA).

Naming
The name "New Mangalore Port" distinguishes it from an old harbour or port in Mangalore city which is called "Mangalore bunder" or "Old bunder". The old harbour is south of New Mangalore port and is now used for fishing and for ferrying small goods.

Location
The port is in Panambur, Mangalore on the west coast of India. It is north of the confluence of Gurupura (Phalguni) river to Arabian sea.

History
It was formally inaugurated on 4 May 1974 by the then prime minister Indira Gandhi. Construction began in 1962.

Transport links
The national highway NH-66 (earlier NH-17) passes the port. The nearest railway station is Thokur, but passengers have to alight at Surathkal railway station which is on Konkan railway route, approximately 6 kilometres from the New Mangalore port.

Types of cargo
The port serves hinterland of Karnataka state and to some extent state of Kerala. The major commodities exported through the port are iron ore concentrates and pellets, iron ore fines, manganese, granite stones, coffee, cashew and containerized cargo.

The major imports of the port are crude and petroleum products, LPG, wood pulp, timber logs, finished fertilizers, liquid ammonia, sand, phosphoric acid, other liquid chemicals, and containerized cargo.

New Mangalore Port offers berth for cruise vessels. International tourists alight here and travel the coastal (Karavali) region of Karnataka state. It offers a helicopter facility for the tourists coming by cruise ships.

Awards 
NMPA received the Greentech Environment Award 2014.

References

External links

 New Mangalore Port

Economy of Mangalore
Ports and harbours of Karnataka
Transport in Mangalore
Companies based in Mangalore
1974 establishments in Karnataka
Transport infrastructure completed in 1974